Fear Factor: Khatron Ke Khiladi Torchaar 4 is the fourth season of India's stunt/action reality game show. Fear Factor: Khatron Ke Khiladi, based on the American Fear Factor. The series premiered on Colors TV. The show is hosted by Akshay Kumar. Aarti Chhabria was declared the winner of the show.

Contestants

Partner

References

External links
 

04
2011 Indian television seasons
Colors TV original programming